Cyclemania is a motorcycle racing video game developed by Israeli studio Compro Games and published by Accolade in 1994 for MS-DOS.

Gameplay
Each of the game's five race tracks uses digitized full motion video footage of Israeli public roads.  The game graphics are split between a third-person view of the player character's motorcycle shot from behind and a lower window displaying its instrument panel.

The player must compete with other motorcyclists to be the first to cross the finish line while dodging a variety of roadway obstacles including cows, horses, slow moving cars, and oil spills.

Reception
Computer Gaming World awarded the game three out of five stars. The magazine commended the game's effective use of animation and sound and its novel use of actual video footage, but criticized its lack of a replay value. It wrote that "for a quick thrill, it excels" but also stated that the game is "not a simulation and not the greatest action game, and so may not rev the engines of some gamers."

References

External links 

Cyclemania at Giant Bomb
Cyclemania at IGDB.com

1994 video games
Accolade (company) games
Racing video games
DOS games
DOS-only games
Video games developed in Israel